Parafontaria is a genus of "flat-backed" millipedes (order Polydesmida) consisting of 13 species native to Japan, where they are referred to as train millipedes. This is because some species exhibit periodical swarming behavior during which large numbers congregate and can impact train passage when this congregation occurs on tracks. Documentation of this event goes back to 1920.

Species
Parafontaria crenata     Shinohara, 1986
Parafontaria doenitzi     (Karsch, 1880)
Parafontaria erythrosoma     (Takakuwa, 1942)
Parafontaria falcifera     (Verhoeff, 1936)
Parafontaria ishiii     Shinohara, 1986
Parafontaria laminata     (Attems, 1909) This species is poisonous. 
Parafontaria longa     Shinohara, 1986
Parafontaria longispina     Miyosi, 1951
Parafontaria shiraiwaensis     Shinohara, 1986
Parafontaria terminalis     (Takakuwa, 1942)
Parafontaria tokaiensis     Tanabe, 2002
Parafontaria tonominea     (Attems, 1899)

References

Polydesmida
Endemic fauna of Japan
Millipedes of Asia